"Mean Mr. Mustard" is a song by the English rock band the Beatles from their 1969 album Abbey Road. Written by John Lennon and credited to Lennon–McCartney, it is the third track of the album's B-side medley. It was recorded with "Sun King" in one continuous piece.

Composition
The song was written during the Beatles' stay in India; Lennon said that it was inspired by a newspaper story about a miser who concealed his cash wherever he could in order to prevent people from forcing him to spend it. On reflection, Lennon did not think highly of the composition, dismissing it in Anthology as "a bit of crap I wrote in India."

A demo version of the song was recorded in May 1968 at Kinfauns, George Harrison's home in Esher. It appears on Anthology 3 and the 2018 Deluxe Edition of The Beatles. In this version, Mustard's sister is named Shirley. Lennon changed it to Pam when he saw the opportunity to ease the segue into the song "Polythene Pam", which follows "Mean Mr. Mustard" on the album. According to Lennon, "In 'Mean Mr. Mustard', I said 'his sister Pam'—originally it was 'his sister Shirley' in the lyric. I changed it to Pam to make it sound like it had something to do with it."

As eventually recorded, "Mustard" originally was to end in the chord of D major—this would have led into the next track in the climactic medley, "Her Majesty". However, since the latter song was moved to the end of the album, "Mustard" instead hard-edits into "Polythene Pam", and thus the final note of "Mustard" would open "Her Majesty" as a stand-alone track at the album's conclusion. The complete version of "Mustard" (with its original clean ending) can be heard on The Beatles: Rock Band video game, as well as Abbey Roads 2019 Super Deluxe Edition.

Origin
A newspaper article from the 7 June 1967 Daily Record with the headline "A Mean Husband Shaved in the Dark" features a man called John Mustard, who lived in Enfield, Middlesex. In 1980, Lennon said: "I’d read somewhere in the paper about this mean guy who was hiding £5 notes, not up his nose but ­somewhere else, and so I wrote about him."

Personnel
 John Lennon – lead and harmony vocals, rhythm guitar, piano
 Paul McCartney – harmony vocals, fuzz bass
 George Harrison – lead guitar
 Ringo Starr – drums, tambourine, maracas

Cover versions
Booker T. & the MGs on their 1970 album McLemore Avenue.

Notes

References

External links

Songs about fictional male characters
The Beatles songs
1969 songs
Song recordings produced by George Martin
Songs written by Lennon–McCartney
Songs published by Northern Songs